Jason Emery (born 21 September 1993) is a New Zealand rugby union player who represents the  in Super Rugby, as well as for Manawatu in the Mitre 10 Cup. He also plays for Rugby New York in Major League Rugby (MLR) in the United States. His position of choice is centre.

Early life and schooling
Born in Tauranga, Emery moved south to Wellington before ending up in Palmerston North at the age of 13. While attending Palmerston North Boys' High School, Emery made the school's 1st XV as a centre as a year 11 student in 2009, competing in the Super 8 schools competition.

In 2010, Emery made the New Zealand Schools team. He scored a try in the annual trans-Tasman 'Test' against the Australia Schoolboys, played in Littlebourne. The match was won by New Zealand 30–21. The team had previously played Tonga Schools and Otago U19 two weeks earlier.

The following year Emery, while in his final year at school, played for New Zealand schools against Australia, at Knox Grammar School in Sydney. New Zealand lost 19–26, with fellow midfielder, who was also from PNBHS, Ngani Laumape scoring New Zealand's only try.

Playing career
While still at school, Emery was signed by the Manawatu Rugby Union, but didn't make his provincial debut until 24 August 2012. Before that, he went to South Africa to compete at the Junior Rugby World Cup with the New Zealand U20 team, coming in 2nd place. He made his debut at the age of 18, against the Wellington Lions in the National Provincial Championship. He came on as a substitute in the final 30 minutes. He went on to help create the only try by Manawatu in the 11–30 loss at Central Energy Trust Arena in Palmerston North. He scored his first try for his province in a 33–20 win over Northland in a Championship match. It was also Emery's first start for his province.

He made his debut in the 19–23 loss to the Hurricanes at Forsyth Barr Stadium in Dunedin on 15 March 2013.

On 22 April 2016, in his first start during the 2016 Super Rugby season for the Highlanders against the Sharks, within the first 15 minutes Emery was involved in a mid-air collision with opposing fullback Willie le Roux. This resulted in le Roux falling dangerously on his back. Because of his actions Emery was red carded and banned from playing for 4 weeks.

References

External links
Highlanders profile
 http://www.stuff.co.nz/manawatu-standard/sport/4178041/Emery-boasts-legends-genes
 http://www.allblacks.com/news/14388/New-Zealand-Schools-team-to-play-Tonga-Schools
 http://www.allblacks.com/news/14421/NZ-Schools-team-to-play-Otago-Under-19
 http://www.stuff.co.nz/manawatu-standard/sport/4178041/Emery-boasts-legends-genes
 http://www.allblacks.com/news/14459/NZ-Schools-team-to-play-Australia-Schools
 http://www.allblacks.com/news/14471/NZ-Schools-beat-Australia
 http://www.allblacks.com/news/17292/NZ-Schools-selection-to-play-Australia-named
 http://www.allblacks.com/news/17668/NZ-Schools-team-to-play-Australia-A-Schools
 http://www.allblacks.com/news/17709/New-Zealand-Schoolboys-lose-to-Australian-counterparts 
 https://web.archive.org/web/20120826035351/http://www.itmcup.co.nz/itmCupnews/20242/Wellington-too-good-for-Turbos
 https://web.archive.org/web/20120906063855/http://www.itmcup.co.nz/itmCupnews/20343/Auckland-turn-on-the-pace-at-Eden-Park
 https://archive.today/20130223022042/http://www.itmcup.co.nz/itmCupNews/20370/Manawatu-lift-sagging-spirits-in-Whangarei
 https://archive.today/20130222215734/http://www.itmcup.co.nz/itmCupNews/20418/Tasman-beat-Manawatu-with-a-bonus-point

1993 births
Living people
New Zealand rugby union players
Rugby union centres
Rugby union wings
Rugby union players from Tauranga
Highlanders (rugby union) players
Manawatu rugby union players
People educated at Palmerston North Boys' High School
Māori All Blacks players
Sunwolves players
Rugby union fullbacks
Munakata Sanix Blues players
Rugby New York players